In baseball, a home run (HR) is typically a fair hit that passes over an outfield fence or into the stands at a distance from home plate of 250 feet or more, which entitles the batter to legally touch all bases and score without liability. Atypically, a batter who hits a fair ball and touches each base in succession from 1st to home, without an error being charged to a defensive player, is credited with an inside-the-park home run. If, during a play, defensive or fan interference is called, and the awarded bases allow the batter to cross home plate, the batter is credited with a home run.

Wes Ferrell holds the all-time Major League Baseball record for home runs hit while playing the position of pitcher. He hit 37 as a pitcher. Baseball Hall of Famers Bob Lemon and Warren Spahn are tied for second with 35 career home runs apiece. Red Ruffing, Earl Wilson, and Don Drysdale are the only other pitchers to hit at least 25 home runs. Jack Stivetts hit a total of 35 home runs in his playing career, 21 as a pitcher. Ferrell and Ruffing also rank among the top pitchers in batting average, hitting .280 and .269, respectively.

As of the 2021 season, Madison Bumgarner, with 19 home runs, holds the lead among all active pitchers.  Bumgarner also has hit the second most home runs by a pitcher since the American League adopted the designated hitter rule in 1973 (behind Carlos Zambrano).  Bumgarner has played his most of his career thus far for the San Francisco Giants of the National League, and is currently playing for the Arizona Diamondbacks. Starting with the 2022 season, the National League also adopted the designated hitter rule, so most pitchers will no longer bat, excepting two-way players, such as Shohei Ohtani.

Ferrell, who had a career slash line of .280/.351/.446, had his best offensive year in 1931, when he set the single-season record for home runs by a pitcher with nine. The record had previously been held by Stivetts, who had hit seven in 1890. Since 1931, six different pitchers have hit seven home runs in a season: Ferrell, Lemon, Don Newcombe, Don Drysdale (twice), Wilson, and Mike Hampton.

Babe Ruth started his major league career as a pitcher before moving to the outfield.  Only 14 of his 714 career home runs were hit as a pitcher, however.

The first pitcher to officially hit a home run was Jack Manning, who accomplished the feat on August 3, 1876. The most home runs by a pitcher in a single game is three, achieved by Jim Tobin on May 13, 1942.

Career

All-time

Active

 Statistics obtained from MLB.com. Updated through August 28, 2022.

Single-season

Progression of the single-season record

Single-game

Notes

References

Bibliography
 

Home runs, pitchers